Myrmelachista is a Neotropical genus of ants in the subfamily Formicinae. The genus is found exclusively in the Neotropical realm. Little is known regarding their biology.

Habitat and distribution
The genus is restricted to the Neotropical region, and 41% of the species in this genus can be found in Brazil. The species in this genus are arboreal and engage in the specialized practice of nesting in trunk cavities and among twigs. These ant species may also form complex mutual associations with certain myrmecophytes or with Coccidae and Pseudococcidae species. Little information is available regarding the biology of Myrmelachista species; however, it is known that these species generally feed on extrafloral nectaries and on animal-derived proteins.

Description
Myrmelachista species possess between nine and 10 antennal segments. Most nine-segmented Myrmelachista species are found in Central America and the Caribbean (with only two known nine-segmented Myrmelachista species in South America), whereas 10-segmented Myrmelachista species are mostly found in South America (with only three known 10-segmented Myrmelachista species found in Mexico and Central America). The larvae of Myrmelachista ants are elongate and unremarkable, excepting for a few protruding dorsal hairs which might have a biological function in hanging larvae inside their nests.

The circumscription of Myrmelachista species is a complex task because the morphological differences between individuals of a single species that originate from different colonies can be sufficient to cause these individuals to be erroneously regarded as members of different species.

Species
, 58 Myrmelachista species have been described, with a few recognized subspecies; the diversity of this genus has most likely been underestimated due to the limited taxonomic knowledge available regarding Myrmelachista. In the most recent molecular databased phylogenetic proposals for ants, Myrmelachista is a sister group of Brachymyrmex, and these groups constitute the most basal and closely related formicine groups.

Myrmelachista ambigua Forel, 1893
Myrmelachista amicta Wheeler, 1934
Myrmelachista arborea Forel, 1909
Myrmelachista arthuri Forel, 1903
Myrmelachista bambusarum Forel, 1903
Myrmelachista bettinae Forel, 1903
Myrmelachista brevicornis Wheeler, 1934
Myrmelachista bruchi Santschi, 1922
Myrmelachista catharinae Mayr, 1887
Myrmelachista chilensis Forel, 1904
Myrmelachista cooperi (Gregg, 1951)
Myrmelachista dalmasi Forel, 1912
Myrmelachista donisthorpei Wheeler, 1934
Myrmelachista elata Santschi, 1922
Myrmelachista elongata Santschi, 1925
Myrmelachista flavida Wheeler, 1934
Myrmelachista flavocotea Longino, 2006
Myrmelachista flavoguarea Longino, 2006
Myrmelachista gagates Wheeler, 1936
Myrmelachista gagatina Emery, 1894
Myrmelachista gallicola Mayr, 1887
Myrmelachista goeldii Forel, 1903
Myrmelachista goetschi (Menozzi, 1935)
Myrmelachista guyanensis Wheeler, 1934
Myrmelachista haberi Longino, 2006
Myrmelachista hoffmanni Forel, 1903
Myrmelachista joycei Longino, 2006
Myrmelachista kloetersi Forel, 1903
Myrmelachista kraatzii Roger, 1863
Myrmelachista lauroatlantica Longino, 2006
Myrmelachista lauropacifica Longino, 2006
Myrmelachista longiceps Longino, 2006
Myrmelachista longinoda Forel, 1899
Myrmelachista mayri Forel, 1886
Myrmelachista meganaranja Longino, 2006
Myrmelachista mexicana Wheeler, 1934
Myrmelachista muelleri Forel, 1903
Myrmelachista nigella (Roger, 1863)
Myrmelachista nigrocotea Longino, 2006
Myrmelachista nodigera Mayr, 1887
Myrmelachista osa Longino, 2006
Myrmelachista paderewskii Forel, 1908
Myrmelachista plebecula Menozzi, 1927
Myrmelachista ramulorum Wheeler, 1908
Myrmelachista reclusi Forel, 1903
Myrmelachista reichenspergeri Santschi, 1922
Myrmelachista reticulata Borgmeier, 1928
Myrmelachista rogeri André, 1887
Myrmelachista rudolphi Forel, 1903
Myrmelachista ruszkii Forel, 1903
Myrmelachista schachovskoi Kusnezov, 1951
Myrmelachista schumanni Emery, 1890
Myrmelachista skwarrae Wheeler, 1934
Myrmelachista ulei Forel, 1904
Myrmelachista vicina Kusnezov, 1951
Myrmelachista zeledoni Emery, 1896

References

External links

Formicinae
Ant genera
Hymenoptera of South America
Hymenoptera of North America
Taxa named by Julius Roger